The 2018–19 Orlando Magic season was the 30th season of the franchise in the National Basketball Association (NBA). On April 12, 2018, the Magic fired head coach Frank Vogel after the team missed the playoffs. On May 30, Steve Clifford was named as Vogel's replacement. On September 6, owner Richard DeVos died at the age of 92 from complications of an infection.

On April 7, 2019, the Magic clinched a playoff spot for the first time since the 2011–12 season, which had also been their most recent winning season. Additionally, they became the Southeast Division champions for the first time since the 2009–10 season. With the Magic clinching a playoff berth, the longest playoff drought in the eastern conference was inherited by the New York Knicks who failed to qualify for the postseason since 2012-13.

In the playoffs, the Magic were eliminated by the eventual NBA champion Toronto Raptors in the first round, losing in five games.

Draft picks

Roster

Standings

Division

Conference

Game log

Preseason

|- style="background:#fcc;"
| 1
| October 1
| @ Philadelphia
| 
| Nikola Vučević (20)
| Aaron Gordon (7)
| D. J. Augustin (6)
| Wells Fargo Center12,005
| 0–1
|- style="background:#cfc;"
| 2
| October 5
| Flamengo
| 
| Aaron Gordon (29)
| Mo Bamba (9)
| Jerian Grant (7)
| Amway Center14,667
| 1–1
|- style="background:#fcc;"
| 3
| October 8
| @ Miami
| 
| Nikola Vučević (22)
| Nikola Vučević (14)
| D. J. Augustin (5)
| American Airlines Arena19,600
| 1–2
|- style="background:#cfc;"
| 4
| October 10
| Memphis
| 
| Gordon, Isaac (15)
| Nikola Vučević (15)
| D. J. Augustin (6)
| Amway Center14,299
| 2–2
|- style="background:#fcc;"
| 5
| October 12
| San Antonio
| 
| Evan Fournier (23)
| Nikola Vučević (12)
| D. J. Augustin (6)
| Amway Center16,424
| 2–3

Regular season

|- style="background:#cfc;"
| 1
| October 17
| Miami
| 
| Aaron Gordon (26)
| Aaron Gordon (16)
| Evan Fournier (5)
| Amway Center19,191
| 1–0
|- style="background:#fcc;"
| 2
| October 19
| Charlotte
| 
| Terrence Ross (14)
| Aaron Gordon (10)
| Nikola Vučević (4)
| Amway Center17,668
| 1–1
|- style="background:#fcc;"
| 3
| October 20
| @ Philadelphia
| 
| Evan Fournier (31)
| Nikola Vučević (13)
| Nikola Vučević (12)
| Wells Fargo Center20,318
| 1–2
|- style="background:#cfc;"
| 4
| October 22
| @ Boston
| 
| Nikola Vucevic (24)
| Isaac, Vučević (12)
| Augustin, Fournier (10)
| TD Garden18,624
| 2–2
|- style="background:#fcc;"
| 5
| October 25
| Portland
| 
| Nikola Vučević (24)
| Nikola Vučević (11)
| Evan Fournier (6)
| Amway Center15,114
| 2–3
|- style="background:#fcc;"
| 6
| October 27
| @ Milwaukee
| 
| Nikola Vučević (16)
| Nikola Vučević (9)
| Augustin, Ross (4)
| Fiserv Forum17,341
| 2–4
|- style="background:#fcc;"
| 7
| October 30
| Sacramento
| 
| Aaron Gordon (18)
| Nikola Vučević (15)
| Jerian Grant (6)
| Amway Center15,074
| 2–5

|- style="background:#fcc;"
| 8
| November 2
| L.A. Clippers
| 
| Nikola Vučević (22)
| Nikola Vučević (11)
| Fournier, Grant (4)
| Amway Center15,953
| 2–6
|- style="background:#cfc;"
| 9
| November 4
| @ San Antonio
| 
| Aaron Gordon (26)
| Mo Bamba (11)
| Augustin, Fournier (7)
| AT&T Center18,354
| 3–6
|- style="background:#cfc;"
| 10
| November 5
| Cleveland
| 
| Aaron Gordon (23)
| Nikola Vučević (10)
| Evan Fournier (5)
| Amway Center15,009
| 4–6
|- style="background:#fcc;"
| 11
| November 7
| Detroit
| 
| Evan Fournier (27)
| Aaron Gordon (10)
| D. J. Augustin (7)
| Amway Center16,103
| 4–7
|- style="background:#cfc;"
| 12
| November 9
| Washington
| 
| Nikola Vučević (21)
| Nikola Vučević (14)
| Evan Fournier (6)
| Amway Center16,562
| 5–7
|- style="background:#cfc;"
| 13
| November 11
| @ New York
| 
| Terrence Ross (22)
| Nikola Vučević (14)
| Jerian Grant (8)
| Madison Square Garden19,812
| 6–7
|- style="background:#fcc;"
| 14
| November 12
| @ Washington
| 
| Terrence Ross (21)
| Nikola Vučević (11)
| Evan Fournier (5)
| Capital One Arena15,346
| 6–8
|- style="background:#cfc;"
| 15
| November 14
| Philadelphia
| 
| Nikola Vučević (30)
| Nikola Vučević (8)
| D. J. Augustin (9)
| Amway Center15,921
| 7–8
|- style="background:#cfc;"
| 16
| November 17
| L.A. Lakers
| 
| Nikola Vučević (36)
| Nikola Vučević (13)
| D. J. Augustin (7)
| Amway Center19,249
| 8–8
|- style="background:#cfc;"
| 17
| November 18
| New York
| 
| Aaron Gordon (31)
| Nikola Vučević (10)
| Nikola Vučević (9)
| Amway Center15,898
| 9–8
|- style="background:#fcc;"
| 18
| November 20
| Toronto
| 
| Evan Fournier (27)
| Nikola Vučević (18)
| Augustin, Grant (5)
| Amway Center16,016
| 9–9
|- style="background:#fcc;"
| 19
| November 23
| @ Denver
| 
| Terrence Ross (18)
| Aaron Gordon (9)
| Fournier, Gordon, Grant (5)
| Pepsi Center19,520
| 9–10
|- style="background:#cfc;"
| 20
| November 25
| @ L.A. Lakers
| 
| Nikola Vučević (31)
| Nikola Vučević (15)
| D. J. Augustin (9)
| Staples Center18,997
| 10–10
|- style="background:#fcc;"
| 21
| November 26
| @ Golden State
| 
| Nikola Vučević (30)
| Nikola Vučević (12)
| D. J. Augustin (9)
| Oracle Arena19,596
| 10–11
|- style="background:#fcc;"
| 22
| November 28
| @ Portland
| 
| Nikola Vučević (20)
| Nikola Vučević (8)
| Grant, Vučević (7)
| Moda Center18,865
| 10–12
|- style="background:#cfc;"
| 23
| November 30
| @ Phoenix
| 
| Nikola Vučević (25)
| Nikola Vučević (15)
| D. J. Augustin (6)
| Talking Stick Resort Arena13,228
| 11–12

|- style="background:#cfc;"
| 24
| December 4
| @ Miami
| 
| Aaron Gordon (20)
| Aaron Gordon (13)
| Augustin, Gordon (5)
| American Airlines Arena19,600
| 12–12
|- style="background:#fcc;"
| 25
| December 5
| Denver
| 
| Evan Fournier (26)
| Nikola Vučević (14)
| Augustin, Gordon (5)
| Amway Center16,636
| 12–13
|- style="background:#fcc;"
| 26
| December 7
| Indiana
| 
| Nikola Vučević (22)
| Aaron Gordon (14)
| Aaron Gordon (4)
| Amway Center17,214
| 12–14
|- style="background:#fcc;"
| 27
| December 10
| @ Dallas
| 
| Jonathon Simmons (18)
| Nikola Vučević (16)
| Nikola Vučević (4)
| American Airlines Center19,334
| 12–15
|- style="background:#cfc;"
| 28
| December 13
| Chicago
| 
| Nikola Vučević (26)
| Nikola Vučević (10)
| Aaron Gordon (7)
| Mexico City Arena20,201
| 13–15
|- style="background:#cfc;"
| 29
| December 15
| Utah
| 
| Evan Fournier (24)
| Nikola Vučević (19)
| Augustin, Vučević (5)
| Mexico City Arena20,011
| 14–15
|- style="background:#fcc;"
| 30
| December 19
| San Antonio
| 
| D. J. Augustin (17)
| Aaron Gordon (9)
| Aaron Gordon (7)
| Amway Center17,138
| 14–16
|- style="background:#fcc;"
| 31
| December 21
| @ Chicago
| 
| Evan Fournier (24)
| Nikola Vučević (19)
| Evan Fournier (6)
| United Center20,436
| 14–17
|- style="background:#fcc;"
| 32
| December 23
| Miami
| 
| Evan Fournier (17)
| Isaac, Vučević (7)
| Aaron Gordon (4)
| Amway Center18,846
| 14–18
|- style="background:#fcc;"
| 33
| December 26
| Phoenix
| 
| D. J. Augustin (27)
| Nikola Vučević (13)
| D. J. Augustin (6)
| Amway Center16,755
| 14–19
|- style="background:#cfc;"
| 34
| December 28
| Toronto
| 
| Nikola Vučević (30)
| Nikola Vučević (20)
| Nikola Vučević (8)
| Amway Center18,846
| 15–19
|- style="background:#cfc;"
| 35
| December 30
| Detroit
| 
| D. J. Augustin (26)
| Nikola Vučević (11)
| D. J. Augustin (8)
| Amway Center17,761
| 16–19
|- style="background:#fcc;"
| 36
| December 31
| @ Charlotte
| 
| Aaron Gordon (14)
| Mo Bamba (12)
| Gordon, Grant (5)
| Spectrum Center14,694
| 16–20

|- style="background:#cfc;"
| 37
| January 2
| @ Chicago
| 
| Nikola Vučević (22)
| Nikola Vučević (12)
| Aaron Gordon (9)
| United Center19,013
| 17–20
|- style="background:#fcc;"
| 38
| January 4
| @ Minnesota
| 
| Nikola Vučević (22)
| Nikola Vučević (7)
| Jonathon Simmons (7)
| Target Center14,355
| 17–21
|- style="background:#fcc;"
| 39
| January 6
| @ L.A. Clippers
| 
| Aaron Gordon (17)
| Nikola Vučević (24)
| Nikola Vučević (8)
| Staples Center16,616
| 17–22
|- style="background:#fcc;"
| 40
| January 7
| @ Sacramento
| 
| Terrence Ross (20)
| Nikola Vučević (13)
| Isaiah Briscoe (4)
| Golden 1 Center15,724
| 17–23
|- style="background:#fcc;"
| 41
| January 9
| @ Utah
| 
| D. J. Augustin (23)
| Aaron Gordon (10)
| D. J. Augustin (6)
| Vivint Smart Home Arena18,306
| 17–24
|- style="background:#cfc;"
| 42
| January 12
| Boston
| 
| Aaron Gordon (28)
| Nikola Vučević (13)
| Fournier, Vučević (5)
| Amway Center18,846
| 18–24
|- style="background:#cfc;"
| 43
| January 13
| Houston
| 
| Gordon, Vučević (22)
| Nikola Vučević (9)
| Nikola Vučević (6)
| Amway Center16,982
| 19–24
|- style="background:#fcc;"
| 44
| January 16
| @ Detroit
| 
| Ross, Vučević  (24)
| Nikola Vučević (13)
| D. J. Augustin (7)
| Little Caesars Arena14,019
| 19–25
|- style="background:#fcc;"
| 45
| January 18
| Brooklyn
| 
| Aaron Gordon (23)
| Nikola Vučević (17)
| Nikola Vučević (6)
| Amway Center17,840
| 19–26
|- style="background:#fcc;"
| 46
| January 19
| Milwaukee
| 
| Nikola Vučević (27)
| Bamba, Isaac, Vučević (6)
| D. J. Augustin (7)
| Amway Center18,846
| 19–27
|- style="background:#cfc;"
| 47
| January 21
| @ Atlanta
| 
| Fournier, Vučević (29)
| Nikola Vučević (14)
| Fournier, Ross (7)
| State Farm Arena16,611
| 20–27
|- style="background:#fcc;"
| 48
| January 23
| @ Brooklyn
| 
| Nikola Vučević (21)
| Nikola Vučević (14)
| D. J. Augustin (6)
| Barclays Center13,185
| 20–28
|- style="background:#fcc;"
| 49
| January 25
| Washington
| 
| Nikola Vučević (28)
| Aaron Gordon (11)
| Aaron Gordon (6)
| Amway Center17,216
| 20–29
|- style="background:#fcc;"
| 50
| January 27
| @ Houston
| 
| Aaron Gordon (23)
| Nikola Vučević (17)
| Grant, Vučević (5)
| Toyota Center18,055
| 20–30
|- style="background:#fcc;"
| 51
| January 29
| Oklahoma City
| 
| Nikola Vučević (27)
| Nikola Vučević (11)
| Aaron Gordon (7)
| Amway Center16,341
| 20–31
|- style="background:#cfc;"
| 52
| January 31
| Indiana
| 
| Terrence Ross (30)
| Jonathan Isaac (13)
| Isaiah Briscoe (8)
| Amway Center16,625
| 21–31

|- style="background:#cfc;"
| 53
| February 2
| Brooklyn
| 
| Nikola Vučević (24)
| Isaac, Vučević (12)
| D. J. Augustin (8)
| Amway Center17,385
| 22–31
|- style="background:#fcc;"
| 54
| February 5
| @ Oklahoma City
| 
| Terrance Ross (26)
| Nikola Vučević (9)
| Aaron Gordon (10)
| Chesapeake Energy Arena18,203
| 22–32
|- style="background:#cfc;"
| 55
| February 7
| Minnesota
| 
| Terrence Ross (32)
| Nikola Vučević (10)
| D. J. Augustin (6)
| Amway Center17,184
| 23–32
|- style="background:#cfc;"
| 56
| February 9
| @ Milwaukee
| 
| Jonathan Isaac (17)
| Nikola Vučević (17)
| Isaiah Briscoe (7)
| Fiserv Forum17,812
| 24–32
|- style="background:#cfc;"
| 57
| February 10
| @ Atlanta
| 
| Nikola Vučević (19)
| Nikola Vučević (12)
| D. J. Augustin (10)
| State Farm Arena13,370
| 25–32
|- style="background:#cfc;"
| 58
| February 12
| @ New Orleans
| 
| Nikola Vučević (25)
| Nikola Vučević (17)
| Isaiah Briscoe (8)
| Smoothie King Center15,733
| 26–32
|- style="background:#cfc;"
| 59
| February 14
| Charlotte
| 
| Terrence Ross (21)
| Gordon, Vučević (11)
| D. J. Augustin (7)
| Amway Center18,846
| 27–32
|- style="text-align:center;"
| colspan="9" style="background:#bbcaff;"|All-Star Break
|- style="background:#fcc;"
| 60
| February 22
| Chicago
| 
| Nikola Vučević (19)
| Nikola Vučević (13)
| Nikola Vučević (7)
| Amway Center18,846
| 27–33
|- style="background:#cfc;"
| 61
| February 24
| @ Toronto
| 
| Nikola Vučević (23)
| Nikola Vučević (12)
| D. J. Augustin (8)
| Scotiabank Arena19,800
| 28–33
|- style="background:#fcc;"
| 62
| February 26
| @ New York
| 
| Gordon, Vučević (26)
| Nikola Vučević (11)
| Evan Fournier (8)
| Madison Square Garden17,833
| 28–34
|- style="background:#cfc;"
| 63
| February 28
| Golden State
| 
| Aaron Gordon (22)
| Aaron Gordon (15)
| Nikola Vučević (6)
| Amway Center18,846
| 29–34

|- style="background:#cfc;"
| 64
| March 2
| @ Indiana
| 
| Nikola Vučević (27)
| Gordon, Isaac, Vučević (8)
| Evan Fournier (8)
| Bankers Life Fieldhouse17,923
| 30–34
|- style="background:#fcc;"
| 65
| March 3
| @ Cleveland
| 
| Nikola Vučević (28)
| Nikola Vučević (13)
| Nikola Vučević (6)
| Quicken Loans Arena19,432
| 30–35
|- style="background:#fcc;"
| 66
| March 5
| @ Philadelphia
| 
| Evan Fournier (25)
| Nikola Vučević (12)
| D. J. Augustin (5)
| Wells Fargo Center20,379
| 30–36
|- style="background:#cfc;"
| 67
| March 8
| Dallas
| 
| Terrence Ross (22)
| Nikola Vučević (13)
| Nikola Vučević (6)
| Amway Center19,196
| 31–36
|- style="background:#fcc;"
| 68
| March 10
| @ Memphis
| 
| Nikola Vučević (26)
| Nikola Vučević (10)
| Augustin, Gordon (6)
| FedExForum16,627
| 31–37
|- style="background:#fcc;"
| 69
| March 13
| @ Washington
| 
| Nikola Vučević (20)
| Nikola Vučević (14)
| D. J. Augustin (7)
| Capital One Arena15,107
| 31–38
|- style="background:#cfc;"
| 70
| March 14
| Cleveland
| 
| Aaron Gordon (21)
| Nikola Vučević (11)
| D. J. Augustin (7)
| Amway Center18,091
| 32–38
|- style="background:#cfc;"
| 71
| March 17
| Atlanta
| 
| Nikola Vučević (27)
| Nikola Vučević (21)
| D. J. Augustin (9)
| Amway Center18,045
| 33–38
|- style="background:#cfc;"
| 72
| March 20
| New Orleans
| 
| Evan Fournier (27)
| Nikola Vučević (17)
| D. J. Augustin (7)
| Amway Center17,005
| 34–38
|- style="background:#cfc;"
| 73
| March 22
| Memphis
| 
| Evan Fournier (27)
| Evan Fournier (8)
| D. J. Augustin (8)
| Amway Center18,025
| 35–38
|- style="background:#cfc;"
| 74
| March 25
| Philadelphia
| 
| Nikola Vučević (28)
| Nikola Vučević (11)
| Evan Fournier (7)
| Amway Center16,848
| 36–38
|- style="background:#cfc;"
| 75
| March 26
| @ Miami
| 
| Nikola Vučević (24)
| Nikola Vučević (16)
| D. J. Augustin (7)
| America Airlines Arena19,704
| 37–38
|- style="background:#fcc;"
| 76
| March 28
| @ Detroit
| 
| Aaron Gordon (20)
| Nikola Vučević (12)
| Augustin, Gordon, Vučević (4)
| Little Caesars Arena18,128
| 37–39
|- style="background:#cfc;"
| 77
| March 30
| @ Indiana
| 
| Aaron Gordon (23)
| Aaron Gordon (10)
| D. J. Augustin (10)
| Bankers Life Fieldhouse17,923
| 38–39

|- style="background:#fcc;"
| 78
| April 1
| @ Toronto
| 
| Evan Fournier (21)
| Nikola Vučević (13)
| Augustin, Carter-Williams (6)
| Scotiabank Arena19,800
| 38–40
|- style="background:#cfc;"
| 79
| April 3
| New York
| 
| Nikola Vučević (29)
| Nikola Vučević (13)
| D. J. Augustin (8)
| Amway Center18,846
| 39–40
|- style="background:#cfc;"
| 80
| April 5
| Atlanta
| 
| Fournier, Ross, Vučević (25)
| Gordon, Vučević (11)
| Augustin, Gordon (7)
| Amway Center18,999
| 40–40
|- style="background:#cfc;"
| 81
| April 7
| @ Boston
| 
| Terrence Ross (26)
| Nikola Vučević (12)
| D. J. Augustin (13)
| TD Garden18,624
| 41–40
|- style="background:#cfc;"
| 82
| April 10
| @ Charlotte
| 
| Terrence Ross (35)
| Gordon, Jefferson (7)
| Michael Carter-Williams (7)
| Spectrum Center17,719
| 42–40

Playoffs

|- style="background:#cfc;"
| 1
| April 13
| @ Toronto
| 
| D. J. Augustin (25)
| Aaron Gordon (10)
| D. J. Augustin (6)
| Scotiabank Arena19,937
| 1–0
|- style="background:#fcc;"
| 2
| April 16
| @ Toronto
| 
| Aaron Gordon (20)
| Michael Carter-Williams (9)
| D. J. Augustin (4)
| Scotiabank Arena19,964
| 1–1
|- style="background:#fcc;"
| 3
| April 19
| Toronto
| 
| Terrence Ross (24)
| Nikola Vukčević (14)
| Aaron Gordon (7)
| Amway Center19,367
| 1–2
|- style="background:#fcc;"
| 4
| April 21
| Toronto
| 
| Aaron Gordon (25)
| Aaron Gordon (7)
| Aaron Gordon (5)
| Amway Center19,087
| 1–3
|- style="background:#fcc;"
| 5
| April 23
| @ Toronto
| 
| D. J. Augustin (15)
| Khem Birch (11)
| Michael Carter-Williams (5)
| Scotiabank Arena19,800
| 1–4

Player statistics

Regular season

|-
| align="left"| || align="center"| PG
| style=";"|81 || style=";"|81 || 2,269 || 203 || style=";"|426 || 52 || 4 || 948
|-
| align="left"| || align="center"| C
| 47 || 1 || 766 || 233 || 39 || 13 || 64 || 292
|-
| align="left"| || align="center"| C
| 50 || 1 || 643 || 190 || 38 || 18 || 29 || 240
|-
| align="left"|‡ || align="center"| PG
| 39 || 0 || 559 || 74 || 87 || 11 || 2 || 136
|-
| align="left"|≠ || align="center"| PG
| 12 || 0 || 227 || 57 || 49 || 11 || 9 || 65
|-
| align="left"| || align="center"| PG
| 4 || 0 || 16 || 3 || 4 || 1 || 0 || 10
|-
| align="left"| || align="center"| SG
| style=";"|81 || style=";"|81 || 2,553 || 258 || 295 || 71 || 12 || 1,226
|-
| align="left"| || align="center"| SG
| 10 || 0 || 44 || 5 || 1 || 1 || 0 || 15
|-
| align="left"| || align="center"| PF
| 78 || 78 || style=";"|2,633 || 574 || 289 || 57 || 56 || 1,246
|-
| align="left"| || align="center"| PG
| 60 || 1 || 939 || 98 || 156 || 44 || 6 || 250
|-
| align="left"| || align="center"| PF
| 75 || 64 || 1,996 || 411 || 80 || 59 || style=";"|98 || 720
|-
| align="left"| || align="center"| SF
| 68 || 13 || 1,233 || 184 || 73 || 28 || 22 || 339
|-
| align="left"| || align="center"| PF
| 12 || 0 || 68 || 21 || 3 || 3 || 3 || 27
|-
| align="left"| || align="center"| PF
| 42 || 1 || 328 || 73 || 18 || 3 || 8 || 115
|-
| align="left"| || align="center"| SG
| style=";"|81 || 0 || 2,150 || 280 || 135 || 72 || 29 || 1,223
|-
| align="left"|† || align="center"| SG
| 41 || 9 || 845 || 100 || 95 || 18 || 14 || 283
|-
| align="left"| || align="center"| C
| 80 || 80 || 2,510 || style=";"|960 || 307 || style=";"|81 || 89 || style=";"|1,665
|}
After all games.
‡Waived during the season
†Traded during the season
≠Acquired during the season

Playoffs

|-
| align="left"| || align="center"| PG
| style=";"|5 || style=";"|5 || 141 || 8 || style=";"|19 || 2 || 1 || 64
|-
| align="left"| || align="center"| C
| style=";"|5 || 0 || 92 || 31 || 4 || 1 || style=";"|5 || 26
|-
| align="left"| || align="center"| PG
| style=";"|5 || 0 || 92 || 20 || 12 || 3 || 0 || 33
|-
| align="left"| || align="center"| SG
| style=";"|5 || style=";"|5 || style=";"|175 || 16 || 10 || style=";"|7 || 0 || 62
|-
| align="left"| || align="center"| SG
| 3 || 0 || 15 || 4 || 0 || 1 || 0 || 5
|-
| align="left"| || align="center"| PF
| style=";"|5 || style=";"|5 || 164 || 36 || 18 || 6 || 1 || style=";"|76
|-
| align="left"| || align="center"| PG
| 3 || 0 || 14 || 4 || 3 || 0 || 0 || 5
|-
| align="left"| || align="center"| PF
| style=";"|5 || style=";"|5 || 137 || 31 || 2 || 2 || style=";"|5 || 33
|-
| align="left"| || align="center"| SF
| style=";"|5 || 0 || 60 || 7 || 4 || 3 || 0 || 24
|-
| align="left"| || align="center"| PF
| 3 || 0 || 18 || 2 || 1 || 0 || 1 || 10
|-
| align="left"| || align="center"| SG
| style=";"|5 || 0 || 146 || 18 || 7 || 6 || 2 || 66
|-
| align="left"| || align="center"| C
| style=";"|5 || style=";"|5 || 147 || style=";"|40 || 15 || 2 || style=";"|5 || 56
|}

Transactions

Trades

Free agency

Re-signed

Additions

Subtractions

Awards and honors
 Nikola Vučević – All-Star

References

Orlando Magic seasons
Orlando Magic
Orlando Magic
Orlando Magic
2010s in Orlando, Florida